Papua New Guinea competed at the 2019 Pacific Games in Apia, Samoa from 7 to 20 July 2019. Team PNG participated in 23 out of the 26 sports on offer at the 2019 games.

Archery

Four archers were confirmed on the PNG team on 17 June 2019.

Men

Women

Athletics

Papua New Guinea listed 48 athletes in track and field as of 21 May 2019 (including 3 parasport athletes).

Men
Track and road events

Field events

Combined events – Decathlon

Women
Track and road events

Field events

Combined events – Heptathlon

Basketball

The Basketball Federation of Papua New Guinea (BFPNG) announced all four squads on 23 June 2019 .

Basketball (5x5)
Papua New Guinea qualified both the men's and women's national teams (12 athletes per team) after a top place finish at the 2017 FIBA Melanesia Basketball Cup in Port Moresby.

Men's tournament
Roster

Tournament summary

Women's tournament
Roster

Tournament summary

Basketball (3x3)
Men
 Dia Muri
 Augustine Kaupa
 Obert Muri
 Jordan Sere

Women
 Louisa Wallace
 Elina Yala
 Serah Amos
 Christine Oscar

Boxing

The Papua New Guinea Amateur Boxing Association (PNGABA) announced a team of 12 boxers (10 men, 2 women). The list was confirmed on 17 June 2019.

Men

Women

Cricket

Football

Tournament summary

Men

The final squad was announced on 12 June 2019.

Head coach: Bob Morris

Women

Roster
Caps and goals updated as of 8 July 2019, after the game against the Solomon Islands.

Golf

Papua New Guinea qualified eight players for the 2019 tournament:

Men
 Morgan Annato
 Soti Dinki
 Cassie Koma
 Gideon Tikili

Women
 Kristine Seko
 Shavina Maras
 Natalie Mok
 Raetania Weiki

Judo

A team of 6 judoka's (3 men, 3 women) was confirmed and named on the 17 June 2019.
Men

Women

Netball

Outrigger canoeing

Powerlifting

Rugby league nines

Papua New Guinea selected fifteen men and fifteen women for the rugby league nines at the 2019 games.

Men's tournament 

 Maya Clarke
 Sailas Gahuna
 Jah Hogen
 Rex Kaupa
 Joel Kee
 Eliakim Lukara
 Moses Okapila
 Mega Pali
 Bill Paul
 Solomon Pokare
 John Ragi Jnr
 Abel Rami
 John Stanley
 Sani Wabo
 Messach Wallen

Women's tournament 

 Elsie Albert
 Catherine Anjo
 Heather Ario
 Lynel Aua
 Carol Francis
 Shirley Joe
 Janet Johns
 Roswita Kapo
 Joan Kuman
 Lancy Laki
 Lydia Luke
 Ray Rambi
 Winnie Steven
 Joyce Waula
 Vero Waula

Rugby sevens

Women's tournament

The Papua New Guinea Rugby Union announced its women's rugby sevens team on 28 June 2019.

Roster

Tournament summary

Sailing

The Papua New Guinea Yachting Association announced two sailors, siblings Teariki and Rose-Lee Numa, on 17 June 2019.
Men

Women

Shooting

Men

Squash

Swimming

The Papua New Guinea Swimming Incorporated (PNGSI) announced a ten-member squad for the games.

Men
 Josh Tarere
 Holly John
 Benedict Aika
 Samuel Seghers
 Ryan Maskelyne
 Leonard Kalate

Women
 Judith Meauri
 Georgia-Leigh Vele
 Britney Murray
 Anthea Murray

Table tennis

Taekwondo

PNG qualified four (4) athletes in Taekwondo in the 2019 Games and they won three silver medals:

Women
Rose Mary Tona (46 kg)  −46 kg

Men
Bobby Willie (54 kg)  −54 kg
Steven Tommy (63 kg)  −63 kg 
Henry Ori    (74 kg)

Tennis

The Papua New Guinea Tennis Association announced a team of 7 athletes (3 men and 4 women).

Singles

Doubles

Team event

Touch rugby

Men's team roster
 Francis Alu
 Eugene Eka
 Freddy Gelam
 Junior Hoki
 Kele Lessy
 Farapo Makura
 Paul Matuta
 Kere Mavia
 Benny Nelson
 Ravu Ravu
 Marlon Steven
 Andrew Turlom
 Bobby Vavona
 Ellson Waluka

Women's team roster
 Maria Alu
 Pauline Arazi
 Mangai Elomi
 Georgina Genaka
 Angela Geno
 Emmalyn John
 Grace Kouba
 Natalia Kuper
 Bessie Peter
 Kelly Peter
 Nadya Taubuso
 Joylyn Tikot
 Angelena Watego

Summary

Volleyball

The Papua New Guinea Volleyball Federation (PNGVF) will only enter three teams. The men's national indoor team (14 athletes) and both men's and women's national beach volleyball team's (2 athletes per team). The final total squad of 18 athletes was announced on 17 June 2019.

Beach volleyball
Men's tournament

Women's tournament

Volleyball (Indoor)
Men's tournament

Weightlifting

The Papua New Guinea Weightlifting Federation selected 10 weightlifters (5 men, 5 women) for the 2019 games.

Men

Women

References

Nations at the 2019 Pacific Games
2019